Misaki Kawai (河井美咲) (born 1978 in Ōkawa, Kagawa, Japan) is a Japanese artist.  Her work has been shown extensively in the United States. "Her father was an architect and amateur painter and her mother made clothing and puppets"  Kawai creates installations out of papier-mâché, wood, fabric, and other low-tech, "crafty" materials like felt, stickers, and yarn. She shuns expertise and uses an anime method called heta-uma that "risks amateur aesthetics by embracing basic expression"  Kawai artist books include Blueberry Express (Nieves Press, 2009), Pencil Exercise (Edition Nord, 2011), Steamy Buns (nos:books, 2020).

From December 2020 through April 2021, Kawai held her first installation in Australia, Moja Moja Land.

References

Further reading
Smith, Roberta "Make Room for Video, Performance and Paint," The New York Times, January 3, 2010
Michilis, Raphael "Good Sense Bad Technique" (Interview), Elephant, Issue No.1, Winter 2009-10
"Manifesto", Art Review, April Issue #31, 2009
"Wild Feature", New York Times, July 24, 2009
"The Fiction Issue", Vice Magazine, December Issue, 2008
"Tokyo's Hottest Creators Misaki Kawai," Harper's BAZAAR May, 2008
“Making a Home: Japanese Contemporary Artists in New York,” Japan Society, NYC, 2007
Fricke, Kirsten "Misaki Kawai," Theme Magazine, Spring, 2007
McQuaid, Cate "In her whimsical installation, she plays with dolls," The Boston Globe, March 27, 2007
Shirasaka,Yuri "HETA-UMA & Underground Summit Japan/U.S.A. @ ON SUNDAYS & BOROBORO DORODORO SHOW@Watari Museum of Contemporary Art", Bijutsu Techo, Vol.59, No.890, January, 2007
"A Decade Of Art In Tokion" (Interview), Revisionaries, 2007
"Trouble At Play", Modern Painters, November Issue, 2007
"It’s a Beautiful Day", The Asahi Shimbun, January 13, 2006
Goodman, Wendy "home is where the art is," MODERNPAINTERS, March, 2006
Saltz, Jerry "Lesser New York", The Village VOICE, March 28, 2005
Smith, Roberta "Desired Constellations," The New York Times, August 5, 2005
Poor, Kristin "PROJECT IN THE MAKING...: THE WOW-WEE WORLD OF MISAKI KAWAI," ArtAsiaPacific No.45 Summer, 2005
LaVallee, Andrew "Majority Whip: Get Personal with Politics," NY ARTS, July/August, 2004
Buckner, Clark "Kuru Kuru Jet," GUARDIAN: The San Francisco Bay, June 2, 2004
Mar, Alex "Misaki Kawai," The New York Sun, February 6, 2003
Smith, Roberta "A Bread-Crumb Trail to the Spirit of the Times", The New York Times, 2003
Saltz, Jerry "Rays of Light", The Village Voice, 2003
Smith, Roberta "ART IN REVIEW, MISAKI KAWAI," The New York Times, January 31, 2003
Smith, Roberta "ART REVIEW; A Bread-Crumb Trail to the Spirit of the Times," The New York Times, January 17, 2003
Smith, Roberta "ART GUIDE: TENTIONISM," The New York Times, March 15, 2002

External links
Official site

1978 births
Living people
Japanese artists
Japanese women artists